Pirattiyur is a part of the city of Tiruchirappalli and located in Tiruchirappalli West taluk, Tiruchirappalli district, Tamil Nadu, India. A former Town Panchayat, which covers the whole of Edamalaipatti Pudur, it was merged with the Tiruchirappalli Corporation in 1994.

The Regional Transport Office (Tiruchirappalli West) is located here. The famous Rettai Malai Temple is located nearby Pirattiyur and has a festival annually. Pirattiyur people and people from Madurai, Tirunelveli, and Thoothukudi also attend this festival. This Rettai Malai connects Edamalaipatti Pudur Trichy with Pirattiyur.

References

Neighbourhoods and suburbs of Tiruchirappalli